Hylaeonympha magoi is a species of damselfly in the family Coenagrionidae. It is endemic to Venezuela.

References

Endemic fauna of Venezuela
Coenagrionidae
Odonata of South America
Insects described in 1968
Taxonomy articles created by Polbot